The 93rd Brigade was a formation of  the British Army during the First World War. It was raised as part of the new army also known as Kitchener's Army and assigned to the 31st Division. The brigade served in Egypt defending the Suez Canal between January and March 1916, and then left for the Western Front. In April 1918, after suffering heavy casualties the 93rd and 92nd Brigades, were amalgamated for two days, and known as the 92nd Composite Brigade.

Formation
The infantry battalions did not all serve at once, but all were assigned to the brigade during the war:
15th Battalion, West Yorkshire Regiment (1st Leeds)
16th Battalion, West Yorkshire Regiment (1st Bradford)
18th Battalion, West Yorkshire Regiment (2nd Bradford)
18th Battalion, Durham Light Infantry (1st County of Durham)
93rd Machine Gun Company 	
93rd Trench Mortar Battery
13th Battalion, York & Lancaster Regiment

References

Infantry brigades of the British Army in World War I
Pals Brigades of the British Army